Robert Martin Boyar (March 10, 1937, New York – November 27, 1978, Dallas, Texas) was a physician and endocrinologist known for his studies of the neuroendocrinology of puberty.

Early years and education
Boyar received his MD from Albert Einstein College of Medicine, Bronx, New York, 1962. He was a Navy physician during the Vietnam War, and on the medical staff of Montefiore Medical Center. For 2½ years he was Associate Professor of Internal Medicine, University of Texas Southwestern Medical School, Dallas.

Scientific discoveries
Boyar is best known for his studies of gonadotropin secretion in puberty. An American physiologist, Ernst Knobil, discovered that the anterior pituitary produces pulses of Luteinizing hormone at about hourly intervals. The luteinizing hormone pulses are the consequence of pulsatile gonadotropin releasing hormone secretion by the hypothalamus into the pituitary portal circulation that, in turn, is the result of an oscillator or signal generator in the central nervous system (the "gonadotropin releasing hormone pulse generator"). Boyar demonstrated that in children approaching puberty the Luteinizing Hormone pulses occur only during sleep. This sleep related gonadotropin secretion initiates testosterone secretion in boys and
estradiol secretion in girls, which ultimately result in the clinical characteristics
associated with human puberty. Some investigators have attributed the onset of puberty to a resonance of oscillators in the brain. By this mechanism, the gonadotropin pulses that occur during sleep in puberty represent beats.

References

Bibliography
Sizonenko, PC. Role of sex steroids during development—integration. in Bourguignon, Jean Pierre & Tony M. Plant. The Onset of Puberty in Perspective: Proceedings of the 5th International Conference on the Control of the Onset of Puberty, Held in Liège, Belgium, 26–28 September 1999. Elsevier. Amsterdam & New York 2000.  pp 299–306.  

American endocrinologists
1937 births
1978 deaths
Physicians from New York (state)
20th-century American physicians